Pismo State Beach is a beach on the Pacific coast in the U.S. state of California. It is approximately 17 miles long and fronts the towns of Pismo Beach, Grover Beach, and Oceano in San Luis Obispo County. It is managed by the California Department of Parks and Recreation.

The area includes a beach and dunes.

Recreational uses
The beach offers many attractions such as camping, hiking, swimming, surfing, and fishing, and is home to the famous Pismo clam. It is a popular place to bird watch and is the largest over-wintering colony of monarch butterflies in the U.S.

The Cal Poly Mustangs women's beach volleyball team has used the beach for home beach volleyball matches.

Animal and plant life
The beach is home to many forms of marine life, such as abalone, anemones, crabs, kelp, and sea urchins. Several types of birds also live at the beach, such as the brown pelican, great blue heron.

A large monarch butterfly population winters over at the Pismo Beach Monarch Butterfly Grove. It is popular to view the monarch migration from November to February.

Pismo Beach/ Oceano Dunes District Visitor Center
The Visitor Center is located in Oceano Campground at Pismo State Beach. Operated by Ca State Parks, the center features exhibits about the park's Natural, Cultural and Recreational history. Education programs are offered for campers, schools and group organizations, and lead guided walks. There is also a gift shop.

See also
List of beaches in California
California State Beaches
List of California state parks

References

External links 

Official Pismo State Beach website
Pismo Beach Nature Center - Central Coast State Parks Association
Pismo Beach Monarch Butterfly Grove
Activities and things to do in Pismo Beach
Pismo State Beach Golf Course
Pismo State Beach Camping
Panoramic video of Pismo State Beach seen from the Pismo Beach Pier

Beaches of Southern California
Beaches of San Luis Obispo County, California
California State Beaches
Nature centers in California
Parks in San Luis Obispo County, California
Beach volleyball venues in the United States
College beach volleyball venues in the United States
Cal Poly Mustangs women's beach volleyball venues
Volleyball venues in California